Koottu Puzhukkal is a 1987 Indian Tamil-language film written and directed by R. C. Sakthi. The film stars Raghuvaran and Amala, supported by Chandrasekhar and Y. Vijaya. It is based on the novel of the same name by Anuradha Ramanan. The film was released on 12 September 1987.

Plot 

Balu is a young politically conscious and helpful autorickshaw driver who has feelings for his neighbour Manga, whose mother Devaki who is involved in illicit affairs with men coerces Manga to join her. Surya is an unemployed BCom graduate from a family of modest means and is dependent on his older brother for money. The older brother often derides them for asking him for money. Meanwhile, Rajam, another resident of the same housing complex is desirous of Surya. Gundurao is the head of another family with three daughters who need to be married. Vedavalli is a  young working woman who faces troubles in finding a suitor for marriage, with the father of prospective grooms demanding exorbitant amounts in dowry. The climax reveals whether Raghuvaran succeeds in his love.

Cast 

 Raghuvaran as Surya
 Amala as Manga
 Chandrasekhar as Balu
 Y. Vijaya as Rajam
 A. Sakunthala as Devaki
Radha Ravi as Baburam Settu
Deepa
Srikanth as House owner
S. S. Chandran as Gundurao
 Saritha as Vedavalli
S.N.Lakshmi
Kamala Kamesh
 Thideer Kannaiah
K. Rajan as Autorickshaw driver
Ilavarasi
Kutty Padmini
V. Gopalakrishnan
CID Sakunthala
Charu Hassan
T. S. Raghavendra

Production 
Koottu Puzhukkal is based on the novel of the same name by Anuradha Ramanan. Since the film's plot was primarily set in a housing complex, the film was shot at Kamakoti House at T. Nagar. A set was built on the top of the house to show eight houses as per the film's concept.

Soundtrack 
The soundtrack was composed by M. S. Viswanathan.

Release and reception 
Koottu Puzhukkal was released on 12 September 1987. The Indian Express wrote, "It's a poignant film [...] the screenplay flits breathlessly from family to family .. from character to character..  There is a whole gallery....". Jeyamanmadhan of Kalki wrote that with each character saying only two lines, the audience should be given free memory to remember them.

References

External links 
 

1980s Tamil-language films
1987 films
Films based on Indian novels
Films directed by R. C. Sakthi
Films scored by M. S. Viswanathan